Alexandra Melina "Alex" Picatto (born March 6, 1983, in Collinsville, Illinois) is an American business manager, accountant, and former child actress.

Biography
Picatto grew up both in Collinsville and Los Angeles. She was born into an Italian American family. While she was working as an actress, she, her mother and her sister named Antoinette Picatto, also an actress, lived in Los Angeles. In 1992, Picatto was the Illinois Junior Miss of America. She was discovered by a talent agent from the North Shore Talent Agency at age ten when she took part in a Chicago piano competition in 1993. Picatto began working in commercials and then starred in Kidsongs on PBS. After guest starring on Summerland (TV Series) in 2005 Alexandra retired from acting.

Picatto married Chris Olivero, who was an actor in the ABC Family television show Kyle XY. They have one child. Today Alexandra Picatto is an accountant at Waverly Drive Management.

Filmography 
Kidsongs (1993–1995) as herself  (sometimes nicknamed Alex Palm)
Blackbird Hall (1995) as Celia
Not Like Us (1995) as Elizabeth.
The Colony (1995) as Danielle Knowlton
Teen Angel (1997)
7th Heaven (1997) as Rita
Charmed (1999) as Tina Hitchens
Get Real (1999–2000) as Amy Shepherd.
Malcolm in the Middle (2000) as Bridget
Blackout (2001) as Blair Robbins
Kate Brasher (2001) as Carol Williams
Getting There (2002) as Charley Simms
Summerland (2005) as Whitney

References

External links 

 Waverly Drive Management

American television actresses
1983 births
Living people
People from Collinsville, Illinois
Actresses from Illinois
American child actresses
American people of Italian descent
20th-century American actresses
21st-century American actresses